Passeig de Gràcia) is an underground railway and metro station in Barcelona located under Passeig de Gràcia, in Eixample district. It is one of the Barcelona's busiest railway stations and important stop for Barcelona Metro network. It is served by Rodalies de Catalunya suburban railway lines R2 and regional lines R11, R13, R14, R15 and R16, and it is also served by TMB-operated Barcelona Metro lines L2, L3 and L4.

The station includes an artwork entitled Ballarins nus by Angel Orensanz.

History
The first railway station that existed in Passeig de Gràcia was built in 1902. The original station was not underground and lines were linked directly with the lines to Girona and Tarragona. In 1950s it was decided to build a new underground station and cover all the tracks along Aragó street. The work started in 1954 and the station was finished in 1959 as part of the Aragó Tunnel.  It is planned to reform the railway station completely to make it more accessible and to improve its aspect.

Services

Rodalies de Catalunya

Rodalies de Catalunya railway station is situated under Aragó street and between Passeig de Gràcia and Roger de Llúria street. The station has four accesses from the street and all of them go to the main hall where it is possible to connect directly with Barcelona Metro line 3. The main hall has some ticket offices, ticket vending machines and a kiosk. The trains run on the lower level where there are two platforms, each one equipped with a café-bar.

Barcelona Metro

 Barcelona Metro line 2 station was opened in 1995, with the opening of the line between Sant Antoni and Sagrada Família. It is located under Gran Via de les Corts Catalanes and near Passeig de Gràcia. Line 2 station has two accesses each one equipped with many ticket vending machines. On the lower there are two platforms, each one separated from the other like London Underground tube stations. It is directly connected to Barcelona Metro line 4 station and to Barcelona Metro line 3 and Rodalies de Catalunya railway station through a long corridor.

 Barcelona Metro line 3 station was opened in 1924 with the opening of the line between Catalunya and Lesseps, the first metropolitan railway in the city. The station is located under Passeig de Gràcia between Consell de Cent and Aragó streets and has two halls, one at each side of the station. It is directly connected to the railway station and to line 2 and line 4 through a 250 metres-long corridor.
 Barcelona Metro line 4 station was opened in 1973 with the opening of the line between Urquinaona and Joanic. The station is located under Passeig de Gràcia, between Gran Via and Diputació street and has an only hall situated in the south part of the station. The hall has a head office and some ticket vending machines. It is connected to line 3 station through the long corridor. On the lower level there are two platforms, each one separated from the other and connected to line 2 station.

References

External links
 
 Rodalies de Catalunya
 Information about L2 metro station at TMB
 Information about L3 metro station at TMB
 Information about L4 metro station at TMB
 Transports Metropolitans de Barcelona
 Information about Rodalies railway station at Trenscat.com
 Information about L2 metro station at Trenscat.com
 Information about L3 metro station at Trenscat.com
 Information about L4 metro station at Trenscat.com

Railway stations in Spain opened in 1902
Transport in Eixample
Passeig de Gràcia
Barcelona Metro line 2 stations
Barcelona Metro line 3 stations
Barcelona Metro line 4 stations
Railway stations located underground in Spain